The olive whipsnake (Demansia olivacea) is a species of venomous snake in the family Elapidae.

Reproduction 
This D. olivacea species does not have an obvious pattern of reproduction, meaning it does not follow a seasonal pattern. It reproduces offspring throughout the year.

References

Demansia
Snakes of Australia
Reptiles described in 1842
Reptiles of the Northern Territory
Reptiles of Western Australia